The Lessing-Gymnasium (together with its twin school Goethe-Gymnasium) is the oldest Gymnasium in Frankfurt. Named after Gotthold Ephraim Lessing, it was founded in 1519 by the city council.

In 2015 there was a controversy over this school refusing admission to students who were moving up from primary school and who were trying to gain admission to top Frankfurt secondary schools. The headmaster argued that secondary schools have the right to admit the students they desire.

Curriculum

The first foreign languages are Latin and English starting in 5th grade. In the 8th grade the pupils have to choose between French or Ancient Greek. The school also has several orchestras and choirs.

Notable alumni
Notable alumni of the Lessing-Gymnasium include:

Georg Philipp Telemann, Baroque composer
Gustav Koerner, German-American politician
Georg Friedrich Grotefend
Peter Stein
Karl Schwarzschild
Florian Henckel von Donnersmarck

References

Schools in Frankfurt
1519 establishments in the Holy Roman Empire
16th-century establishments in the Holy Roman Empire
Educational institutions established in the 1510s